Elisabetta "Betty" Bavagnoli (born 3 September 1963) is an Italian football coach and former defender or midfielder. As a player, she represented the Italian women's national team and various clubs in women's Serie A.

Playing style
During her playing career versatile Bavagnoli played in several different positions. Beginning as a right winger, she developed into a full back, then a lateral midfielder. She finished her playing days as a sweeper.

Coaching style
Bavagnoli sends her teams out in a traditional 4–4–2, but will sometimes depart from her favoured formation depending on the players at her disposal. She expects her players to pressure opponents high up the pitch.

Playing career

Club
Bavagnoli broke into the team of hometown club Piacenza as a youngster. She stayed for five seasons until the club was dissolved in 1983. She moved on to Modena, then Lazio, where she won her first of seven league titles in 1987–88. At Lazio she also formed a friendship with Carolina Morace which would result in a long professional collaboration. Together with Morace, Bavagnoli played at Reggiana and Milan, leaving the latter in 1993–94 due to the club's financial difficulties. She moved to Torres, then continued her partnership with Morace at Aircargo Agliana, Günther Verona and back at Modena.

Retiring in 1999 at age 36, Bavagnoli finished her career with two seasons back at Lazio. In the first campaign she was player-coach, then she became player-assistant-coach under Morace who managed Lazio in 1998–99, having completed her own playing career. The team collected the 1999 Coppa Italia, beating ACF Milan 4–0 in the final.

International
She debuted for the Italian women's national team in May 1986, in a 1–0 win over Hungary in Potenza. She subsequently played in four editions of the UEFA Women's Championship as well as at the inaugural 1991 FIFA Women's World Cup. She was part of the team which finished second at UEFA Women's Euro 1993, the Azzurre's best achievement to date.

Bavagnoli won 80 caps for Italy, scoring one goal. Her final appearance came in a 2–0 friendly win over England in April 1997.

Coaching career
Immediately after retirement, Bavagnoli joined the coaching staff of Carolina Morace, who had got a job as manager of men's third division club Viterbese. Defeat in the second league match of the 1999–00 season caused the team's unstable owner Luciano Gaucci to say he would replace Morace's staff. Morace resigned, followed by Bavagnoli a few days later.

In July 2000, Morace began coaching the Italian women's national team, with Bavagnoli as her assistant. They had responsibility for the senior and under-18 teams. In 2003 Bavagnoli assumed control of the Italian women's under-19 team and guided them to the 2004 FIFA U-19 Women's World Championship in Thailand.

She then returned to Lazio, as a technical director, alongside Antonello Belli. She worked with the female youth teams at Lodigiani and Fiano Romano, whose senior team she also coached in the 2008–09 season. From February 2009 to July 2011 she assisted Morace in coaching the Canada women's national soccer team, where they won the Cyprus Cup in 2010 and 2011 and the CONCACAF Women's Championship in 2010. Both left following Canada's disappointing 2011 World Cup campaign.

On 10 December 2012, Bavagnoli began attending Coverciano to study for her UEFA Pro Licence—the highest coaching qualification available. She was awarded the licence on 5 July 2013, the only woman who passed. Meanwhile, she had continued to work with Morace, in various ventures related to youth football. from the 2018 until the 2021 season, Bavagnoli coached AS Roma's female Serie A side to excellent results, thus resulting in her being promoted to director responsible of the female division during 2022.

Honours

Club
Lazio
 Serie A (1): 1987–88
 Coppa Italia (1): 1998–99

Reggiana
 Serie A (1): 1990–91

Milan '82
 Serie A (1): 1991–92

Torres
 Serie A (1): 1993–94

Agliana
 Serie A (1): 1994–95

Verona
 Serie A (1): 1995–96

Modena
 Serie A (1): 1996–97

Personal life
In 1993 Bavagnoli was helping her parents run their perfumery. At that time she enjoyed writing poetry and playing the guitar.

Notes

References

External links

 Profile at Italian Football Federation (FIGC) 
 

1963 births
Living people
Italian women's footballers
Italy women's international footballers
Sportspeople from Piacenza
1991 FIFA Women's World Cup players
Torres Calcio Femminile players
Serie A (women's football) players
S.S. Lazio Women 2015 players
Women's association football defenders
Women's association football midfielders
A.S.D. Reggiana Calcio Femminile players
Italian football managers
Serie A (women's football) managers
ACF Milan 82 players
Footballers from Emilia-Romagna
C.F. Euromobil Modena players